

In animals 

Many animal species have mate-selection rituals also referred to as "courtship" anthropomorphically. Animal courtship may involve complicated dances or touching, vocalizations, or displays of beauty or fighting prowess. Most animal courtship occurs out of sight of humans and so it is often the least documented of animal behaviors. One animal whose courtship rituals are well studied is the bower bird, whose male builds a "bower" of collected objects.

From the scientific point of view, courtship in the animal kingdom is the process in which the different species select their partners for reproduction purposes. Generally speaking, the male initiates the courtship, and the female chooses to either mate or reject the male based on his "performance".

Sea turtles

All animals have different courtship rituals that reflect fitness, compatibility with others and ability to provide. Sea turtles court during a limited receptive time. During the courtship, males will either nuzzle the females head to show affection or by gently biting the back of her neck. This may go on for long periods of time, depending on whether the female responds to the male. If the female does respond, by not fleeing, the male will attach himself onto the back of the female's shell using his front flippers. He will stretch his long tail under the back of the females shell to begin copulation.

Courting can be competitive among males. The male that has better endurance will win the female. To a female, endurance is a great trait to be passed on to their offspring; the higher the endurance in the male, the higher the endurance will be in her offspring and the more likely they will be to survive. Female leatherback sea turtles will also choose many different males to copulate with in order to diversify their offspring, since it is known that leatherback sea turtles have female-biased offspring.

Hippopotamus
Despite being aggressive animals, the female hippopotamus is very nurturing and sensitive when caring for offspring. Mating and birth both occur in the water for hippopotamus. This is because it gives them privacy when conceiving and helps conserve energy during birth. The female hippo normally averages around 5–6 years, while males are average an age of 7–8. During mating season the male hippopotamus will find a mate out of the herd, showing interest by smelling the female's posterior end. As long as the male acts submissive during the courting season, the adults in the herd will not interfere. Once the male finds the female he wants to mate with, he begins provoking the female. He then will push the female into the water and mount her. In order to alert the herd or other animals that may be lurking around, the male will let a loud wheezing sound. Preceding birth, the female exhibits aggressive behavior, leaving the herd until after the birth of the calf. Although hippopotamuses can mate anytime of the year, the mating season ranges from February to August. Because the energy cost is high, the female generally only has one offspring in a two-years span.

Honeybees

The courtship behaviour of honey bees follows through two distinct types: apiary vicinity mating and drone assembly mating. Apiary vicinity mating usually takes place in cool weather and is more local to the apiary from which the queen resides. The drones are in the same apiary too, but this doesn't not mean that it will lead to inbreeding. Drones assemble in a bulb of warm air close or far from the apiary. They are alert when the queen has flown out of the hive and will follow her route. This is followed by a sort of fast hum or buzz in the general bee population that follows an upward temperature gradient. The male drone mounts on the virgin queen and inserts his endophallus, ejaculating semen. The male honey bee will then pull away from the queen, but his endophallus will be ripped from his body and remain attached to the newly fertilized queen. The next male honey bee will remove the endophallus that was previously left by the other male honey bee and will eventually ejaculate and lose his own. The frequency of mating for the male honey bees is 7 to 10 times during a mating flight. Most of the drones die quickly immediately after mating, and their abdomen rips open since the endophallus has been removed. The few that survive are usually ejected from their nests, as they have served their sole purpose by mating.

They only attend one mating flight, and the queen stores up to 100 million sperm within her oviducts during this flight, but only 5–6 million are stored in the spermatheca of the queen. Only a few of this sperm are used by the queen at a time to fertilize the eggs throughout her life. New queen generations will mate and produce their colonies if the queen runs out of sperm in her lifetime. The sex of the offspring is controlled by the honey bee queens, as the eggs passing through the oviduct can be determined whether they are fertilized or not by the queen. Research has indicated that eggs that are fertilized develop into female workers and queens, while the unfertilized eggs become drone honey bees. Female workers can lay infertile eggs but do not mate. The infertile eggs become male honey bees. The eggs of the queen are laid in oval-shaped structural cells that usually stick to the nest ceiling. Royal jelly is then filled with these cells to prevent larvae from falling. Soon-to-be workers are fed royal jelly during the first two days. The future queens are given royal jelly throughout the entire larval period. Each member colony development depends on caste. For proper growth from eggs to adult, the male honey bees need 24 days, 21 for workers and only 16 for the queens.

Insect species 
Certain insect species also display courtship behavior in order to attract mates. For example, the species Ceratitis capitata (also known as the medfly) exhibits these behaviors. During the courtship phase, signals are exchanged between males and females to display willingness for mating. The male begins with a series of head movements, then after 1–2 seconds of movement, also begins to fan its wings and moves closer to the female. Once the male is close enough to the female, the male will leap onto the female's back and begin copulation. Another example is seen in the spider species Maratus volans, where the male will perform an elaborate fan dance. The male will open his colorful fan and begin to vibrate in order to draw the attention of the female spider. The male will begin to move closer and closer to the female until copulation.

Allobates femoralis 
Allobates femoralis displays courtship behavior through “courtship march,” in which the male begins the courtship and leads the female to the oviposition site. Its behavior also includes visual components, such as throat display, limb lifting, circling, and leg stretching. Among poison frogs, Allobates femoralis’s courtship duration is the longest. Although females rarely reject males nor evaluate the male's fitness during courtship, they occasionally demand an extended duration of courtship. And while females to not show aggression during courtship, males can interact aggressively with other males in the purpose of territorial defense and competition for female.

References

Mating
Ethology
Animal sexuality